Fabrício Souza may refer to:
Fabrício de Souza, (born 1982), Brazilian footballer
Fabrício Eduardo Souza, (born 1980), Brazilian footballer